"Lay Back in the Arms of Someone" is a song co-written by Nicky Chinn and Mike Chapman, performed by the English band Smokie.

Charts

Weekly charts

Year-end charts

Cover versions
The song was covered by American country music artist Randy Barlow in 1979, whose version peaked at number 13 on the Billboard Hot Country Singles chart.
In 1979 the song was released as a single from Tanya Tucker's album Tear Me Apart, produced by Nicky Chin and Mike Chapman, but it failed to chart.
The track also appeared on Juice Newton's 1979 Take Heart album, as well as 1987's Greatest Hits (And More). Newton's version peaked at #80 on the Billboard Country chart.
Rick Nelson recorded the song, which appears on the 1981 "Four You" EP and 1986 "Memphis Sessions" LP.
 Savoy Brown covered this song on album "Rock n Roll Warriors" 1981.
 Chris Norman included his solo cover of the song on his 2000 studio album "Full Circle".

References

http://www.allmusic.com/album/rock-n-roll-warriors-mw0000063070

External links

 http://www.allmusic.com/album/rock-n-roll-warriors-mw0000063070

1977 singles
1979 singles
Smokie (band) songs
Randy Barlow songs
European Hot 100 Singles number-one singles
Songs written by Nicky Chinn
Songs written by Mike Chapman
1976 songs
RAK Records singles